We Were Dancing is a 1942 MGM romantic comedy film directed by Robert Z. Leonard, written by Claudine West, Hans Rameau and George Froeschel, and starring Norma Shearer and Melvyn Douglas. It is based loosely on Noël Coward's 1935 play of the same name, together with ideas from Ways and Means, another play in Coward's Tonight at 8.30 play cycle, and Coward's Private Lives.

Plot
Vicki Wilomirska (Norma Shearer), an impoverished Polish princess, falls madly in love while dancing with the charming but penniless Austrian baron Nicki Prax (Melvyn Douglas). She ends her engagement to wealthy lawyer Hubert Tyler (Lee Bowman). Nicki and Vicki marry secretly, but are soon exposed by one of Nicki's ex-girlfriends, home decorator Linda Wayne (Gail Patrick). Nicki and Vicki support themselves by being professional house guests, in the homes of American nouveau riche, who are impressed by Old World aristocracy. Eventually, Nicki decides to do the unthinkable, and get a job. Linda still pursues Nicki, and Vicki, brokenhearted, sues Nicki for divorce. Attorney Hubert represents Vicki in the divorce case, and despite Nicki's tender declaration of his love, the teary judge grants the divorce.

When Nicki returns from South America, Linda asks him to see her. At her office, Nicki learns from Linda that Vicki and Hubert are now engaged. Nicki soon persuades Linda to help him get a decorating job with her competitor, who is decorating the new house that Hubert is building for Vicki. Nicki begins the work by behaving professionally, but eventually confesses that he still loves only Vicki. Vicki tells Nicki that he is now too late.  At the fancy betrothal party for Hubert and Vicki, Nicki comes to say goodbye to Vicki. Then, they dance to the same waltz that had ignited their passion when they first met, and the magic returns. Nicki and Vicki elope once more.

Cast
 Norma Shearer as Vicki Wilomirska
 Melvyn Douglas as Nicki Prax
 Gail Patrick as Linda Wayne
 Lee Bowman as Hubert Tyler
 Marjorie Main as Judge Sidney Hawkes
 Reginald Owen as Major Tyler-Blane
 Alan Mowbray as Grand Duke Basil
 Florence Bates as Mrs. Vanderlip
 Heather Thatcher as Mrs. Tyler-Blane
 Connie Gilchrist as Olive Ransome
 Nella Walker as Mrs. Janet Bentley
 Adriana Caselotti as Opera Singer
 Florence Shirley as Mrs. Charteris

Reception
According to MGM records the film made $581,000 in the US and Canada and $498,000 elsewhere, making the studio a loss of $409,000.

References

External links
 
 We Were Dancing at TCMDB
 
 

1942 films
1942 romantic comedy films
American romantic comedy films
American black-and-white films
Comedy of remarriage films
American films based on plays
Films directed by Robert Z. Leonard
Films scored by Bronisław Kaper
Metro-Goldwyn-Mayer films
1940s English-language films
1940s American films